Yaté  is a commune in the South Province of New Caledonia, an overseas territory of France in the Pacific Ocean. The Yaté Dam and Blue River Provincial Park are located within the commune.

Geography

Climate
Yaté has a tropical rainforest climate (Köppen climate classification Af).

Population

References 

Communes of New Caledonia